Claudell is an unincorporated community in Valley Township, Smith County, Kansas, United States.

History
Claudell was a station on the Missouri Pacific Railroad.

A post office was opened in Claudell in 1898, and remained in operation until it was discontinued in 1957.

References

Further reading

External links
 Smith County maps: Current, Historic, KDOT

Unincorporated communities in Smith County, Kansas
Unincorporated communities in Kansas